is a Japanese politician who served as governor of Aichi Prefecture in 1999–2011. A graduate of Chuo University, he served as mayor of Ichinomiya for three terms from 1989 to 1997 before he was first elected governor of Aichi Prefecture in 1999.

References 
 
  

1951 births
Living people
People from Ichinomiya, Aichi
Chuo University alumni
20th-century Japanese lawyers
Mayors of places in Aichi Prefecture
Governors of Aichi Prefecture